The Lexicon Topographicum Urbis Romae (1993–2000) is a six-volume, multilingual reference work considered to be the major, modern work covering the topography of ancient Rome. The editor is Eva Margareta Steinby, and the publisher is Edizioni Quasar of Rome. It is considered the successor to Platner and Ashby's A Topographical Dictionary of Ancient Rome.

An ongoing series of supplements provides additional coverage of Roman topography and important topics in the archaeology of the city.

M. A. Tomei and P. Liverani. Lexicon topographicum urbis Romae. Supplementum. I, Carta archeologica di Roma. Primo quadrante. Rome: Edizioni Quasar, 2005. .
F. Coarelli. Lexicon topographicum urbis Romae. / Supplementum II. 1, Gli scavi di Roma 1878-1921. Rome: Edizioni Quasar, 2004. .
F. Coarelli et al. Lexicon topographicum urbis Romae. Supplementum II. 2, Gli scavi di Roma, 1922-1975. Rome: Edizioni Quasar, 2006. .
Carlo Pavolini. Lexicon topographicum urbis Romae. Supplementum. III, Archeologia e topografia della regione II (Celio) : un'aggiornamento sessant'anni dopo Colini. Rome: Edizioni Quasar, 2006. .
Anna Leone, Domenico Palombi, Susan Walker (ed.), Res bene gestae: ricerche di storia urbana su Roma antica in onore di Eva Margareta Steinby. Lexicon Topographicum Urbis Romae, Supplementum, IV. Rome: Edizioni Quasar, 2007.  Pp. xviii, 478; 169 ills.  .
Elisabetta Carnabuci. Lexicon topographicum urbis Romae. Suppl. V, Lexicon topographicum urbis Romae : Supplementum V: regia : nuovi dati archeologici dagli appunti inediti di Giacomo Boni. Rome: Edizioni Quasar, 2012. .
Lexicon topographicum urbis Romae. Supplementum VII, scritti in onore di Lvcos Cozza. Rome: Edizioni Quasar, 2014. .

A subsequent series, Lexicon topographicum urbis Romae: Suburbium, edited by Adriano La Regina and produced by Edizioni Quasar covers sites in the suburbium of ancient Rome.

Reviews
 R. B. Ulrich. 1995. "Review Article: Archaeological Reference Texts and the Information Age." American Journal of Archaeology 99.1:147-50.
Catharine Edwards. 1996. "Roma Depicta." Review in The Classical Review (New Series), 46.02:354-356 
Review by Gregory S. Bucher BMCR 2001.04.02

References

Topography of the ancient city of Rome
Gazetteers
1993 non-fiction books
Ancient Roman studies